Ezekiel 32 is the thirty-second chapter of the Book of Ezekiel in the Hebrew Bible or the Old Testament of the Christian Bible. This book contains the prophecies attributed to the prophet/priest Ezekiel, and is one of the Books of the Prophets. This chapter contains two revelations from God regarding Egypt and its Pharaoh, concluding Ezekiel's prophecies against Egypt (chapters 29-32).

Text
The original text was written in the Hebrew language. This chapter is divided into 32 verses.

Textual witnesses
Some early manuscripts containing the text of this chapter in Hebrew are of the Masoretic Text tradition, which includes the Codex Cairensis (895), the Petersburg Codex of the Prophets (916), Aleppo Codex (10th century), and Codex Leningradensis (1008).

There is also a translation into Koine Greek known as the Septuagint, made in the last few centuries BC. Extant ancient manuscripts of the Septuagint version include Codex Vaticanus (B; B; 4th century), Codex Alexandrinus (A; A; 5th century) and Codex Marchalianus (Q; Q; 6th century).

Verse 1
 And it came to pass in the twelfth year, in the twelfth month, on the first day of the month, that the word of the Lord came to me, saying, 
The date corresponds to 3 March, 586 or 585 BCE, based on an analysis by German theologian Bernhard Lang. The New Living Translation makes explicit reference to 3 March as the date.

Verse 2
 "Son of man, take up a lamentation for Pharaoh king of Egypt, and say to him:
 ‘You are like a young lion among the nations,
 And you are like a monster in the seas,
 Bursting forth in your rivers,
 Troubling the waters with your feet,
 And fouling their rivers."
 "Son of man" (Hebrew: בן־אדם -): this phrase is used 93 times to address Ezekiel. 
 "Pharaoh" (Hebrew: פרעה ; Egyptian: pr-±o, "great house"; Greek: Φαραω, Pharao): the title of ancient Egyptian kings, of royal court, and (in new kingdom) of the king, until the Persian invasion.

Verse 17
 It came to pass also in the twelfth year, on the fifteenth day of the month, that the word of the Lord came to me, saying:
The date, depending on the month, corresponds to a day between April 27, 586 BCE to March 17, 585 BCE, based on the analysis by Bernhard Lang. The New Living Translation assumes the month is the same as in verse 1, so this revelation would have been heard on 17 March 585 BCE.

Verse 27
 They do not lie with the mighty
 Who are fallen of the uncircumcised,
 Who have gone down to hell with their weapons of war;
 They have laid their swords under their heads,
 But their iniquities will be on their bones,
 Because of the terror of the mighty in the land of the living. (NKJV)
Egypt will join other nations which were judged by God in "the depths of the earth" ("Pit" or "Sheol").

See also

Related Bible parts: Isaiah 14, Ezekiel 29, Ezekiel 30, Ezekiel 31

Notes

References

Bibliography

External links

Jewish
Ezekiel 32 Hebrew with Parallel English
Ezekiel 32 Hebrew with Rashi's Commentary

Christian
Ezekiel 32 English Translation with Parallel Latin Vulgate

32